Australian Mammalogy is a major peer-reviewed scientific journal published by CSIRO Publishing on behalf of the Australian Mammal Society covering research on the biology of mammals that are native or introduced to Australasia. Subject areas include, but are not limited to: anatomy, behaviour, developmental biology, ecology, evolution, genetics, molecular biology, parasites and diseases of mammals, physiology, reproductive biology, systematics and taxonomy.

The current Editor is Ross Goldingay (Southern Cross University).

Abstracting and indexing 
The journal is abstracted by BIOSIS Previews, ELIXIR, Endanger (Threatened Species), GeoRef, Science Citation Index, Scopus, STREAMLINE (Natural Resources) and Zoological Record.

Impact factor 
According to the Journal Citation Reports, the journal has a 2015 impact factor of 0.872.

References

External links 
 

Mammalogy journals
Publications established in 1972
CSIRO Publishing academic journals
Biannual journals
English-language journals
Academic journals associated with learned and professional societies of Australia
1972 establishments in Australia